Party for Democracy may refer to:

 Party for Democracy (Chile), a Chilean political party.
 Party for Democracy in Central Africa, a political party in the Central African Republic.
 Party for Democracy and Progress (disambiguation)
 Party for Democracy and Rally, a defunct political party in Burkina-Faso.
 Party for Democracy and Socialism, a defunct political party in Burkina-Faso.
 Party for Democracy and Socialism/Metba, a political party in Burkina-Faso.
 Party for Democracy and Reconciliation, a political party in Burundi.
 Party for Democracy and Renewal, a political party in Togo.

See also
 Democracy Party (disambiguation)
 Democratic Party (disambiguation)
 Democrat Party (disambiguation)